Tsenovo Municipality is a small municipality (obshtina) in Ruse Province, Central-North Bulgaria, located along the right bank of Danube river in the Danubian Plain where Yantra river flows into the Danube. It is named after its administrative centre - the village of Tsenovo.

Settlements 

Tsenovo Municipality includes the following 9 places, all of them villages:

Demography 
The following table shows the change of the population during the last four decades.

Religion 
According to the latest Bulgarian census of 2011, the religious composition, among those who answered the optional question on religious identification, was the following:

See also
Provinces of Bulgaria
Municipalities of Bulgaria
List of cities and towns in Bulgaria

References

External links
 Official website 

Municipalities in Ruse Province